Eleonora Ehrenbergová or Eleonora Gayerová z Ehrenbergů (1 November 1832 in Modrá Hůrka – 30 August 1912 in Ondřejov) was a Czech operatic soprano.

Career
In 1854 she made her professional opera debut at the Estates Theatre in the title role of Donizetti's Lucia di Lammermoor. In 1866 she created the role of Mařenka in the world première of Bedřich Smetana's The Bartered Bride, and in 1868 she portrayed Jitka in the premiere of Smetana's Dalibor. She retired from the stage sometime in the 1880s.

References 

1832 births
1912 deaths
People from České Budějovice District
Czech operatic sopranos
19th-century Czech women opera singers